Ain Ksour , is a village in Aley District, Lebanon.

Municipal elections are held every four years.

History
In 1838, Eli Smith noted  the place, called 'Ain Kesur, located in El-Ghurb el-Fokany; Upper el-Ghurb.

There are two churches in Ain Ksour. One is Saint Peter and Paul's church, which was built around 800 AD, destroyed during the Lebanese civil war, and rebuilt. The other is Saint Elias's church, which is newer, was destroyed during the Lebanese civil war, and is currently being rebuilt.

References

Bibliography

External links
 Ain Ksour, Localiban 

Populated places in Aley District